Portrait of a Young Man is a painting attributed to the Italian Renaissance painter Masaccio, although this attribution is disputed. The identity of the chaperon-wearing subject of this painting is unknown. The portrait is currently displayed in the National Gallery of Art in Washington, D.C.

External links
 Profile Portrait of a Young Man

Paintings by Masaccio
1425 paintings
Collections of the National Gallery of Art
15th-century portraits